Christine Adams (born 28 February 1974, Georgsmarienhütte) is a German pole vaulter. She won a silver medal at the 1996 European Indoor Championships and a bronze medal at the 2000 European Indoor Championships.

Her personal best is 4.42 metres, achieved in June 2001 in Weissach. This ranks her ninth among German pole vaulters, behind Annika Becker, Yvonne Buschbaum, Carolin Hingst, Anastasija Reiberger, Silke Spiegelburg, Julia Hütter, Nicole Humbert and Martina Strutz. However, with 4.66 metres Adams has a better personal best indoor.

Competition record

See also
 Germany all-time top lists - Pole vault

References

External links
Christine Adams in action

1974 births
Living people
German female pole vaulters
Competitors at the 1999 Summer Universiade
People from Osnabrück (district)
Sportspeople from Lower Saxony